Arthur Joseph Hickton,(born 1868 – died 1932), was an English footballer who played in the Football League for Aston Villa.

Early career
Arthur Hickton first came to prominence in 1886, aged 18/19, when he signed as a Youth Player for Birmingham Waterworks F.C.. There are no online records about this club. There maybe a link to the Birmingham Corporation Water Department. Hickton signed for Aston Villa in July 1889, aged 22.

Season 1889-1890
Arthur Hickton signed for Aston Villa in July 1889. On 30 November 1889 at Thorneyholme Road, Accrington he made his only appearance for the Villa first-team replacing Archie Hunter at Centre-Forward. The match is reported upon by the 30 November 1889  edition of the Lancashire Evening Post. However, Hickton did not get a mention as Villa lost 4–2. He was never selected for the First-team again and left Aston Villa in November 1890.

1890 onwards
For a couple of years Hickton moved between different West Midland clubs. In November 1890 he signed for Rugby Wanderers F.C. and then in 1891, (month unknown) he went to Coventry Standard F.C. There are no on-line records about these clubs. 
In 1892 (month unknown) he joined Nuneaton Welfare F.C. (no on-line records) and settled at this club for ten years. He left Nuneaton Welfare F.C. in 1901 and retired from football in 1902.

Playing Style
Matthews described Hickton as "Tall, strong and versatile, able to play at Centre-Half or Centre-Forward".

References

English footballers
Aston Villa F.C. players
1867 births
1940 deaths
English Football League players
Association football forwards